Hydrocotyle yanghuangensis is a species of flowering plant in the family Araliaceae. It is endemic to Ecuador. Its natural habitats are subtropical or tropical moist montane forests and subtropical or tropical high-altitude grassland.
It is threatened by habitat loss.

References

yanghuangensis
Endemic flora of Ecuador
Vulnerable plants
Taxonomy articles created by Polbot
Plants described in 1936